The Egyptian mouthbrooder (Pseudocrenilabrus multicolor) is a species of cichlid. The common name Egyptian mouthbrooder was often limited to its northern nominate subspecies, in which case the southern P. m. victoriae is called the dwarf Victoria mouthbrooder. These subspecies are not universally regarded as valid.

References

Egyptian mouthbrooder
Fish described in 1903
Taxonomy articles created by Polbot